The Killer Rocks On is an album by Jerry Lee Lewis that was released on Mercury Records in 1972.

Background
After an uninterrupted string of country smashes, The Killer Rocks On was a return to Lewis's rock and roll roots. He had attempted this in the mid-'60s with albums like The Return of Rock and Memphis Beat without commercial success but, as is pointed out in the liner notes to the 2006 compilation A Half Century of Hits, by the early '70s the time was right: "Vintage rock ‘n’ roll was experiencing a rebirth. It had been less than 15 years since Buddy Holly’s death was heralded as the symbolic finale of the rock ‘n’ roll era. The music had changed beyond all recognition since then, and the revival was for those who couldn't stomach the new stuff."  In addition, the original rock and roll spirit would be celebrated in the next few years in films like American Graffiti and in television shows like Happy Days. For original rockers like Lewis, Little Richard, and Chuck Berry, this was a godsend.

Recording and reception
The album is best known for its version of "Chantilly Lace," which had been written by J.P. Richardson, better known as the Big Bopper, who perished in a plane crash with Buddy Holly in 1959. Lewis had his doubts about recording the song but, as he explains in the A Half Century of Hits essay, his manager convinced him: “Sam Phillips’s brother, Jud, was managing me. He was well oiled on that session...I told him I didn’t even know 'Chantilly Lace.' He said, ‘Well, make it up.’ I did one take on it.”  Producer Jerry Kennedy recalled of the sessions to Lewis biographer Nick Tosches, "He wanted everybody there. He didn't want anything overdubbed later. It was a mess. We had an acre of people there - voices, strings, everything. And, as always, Jerry Lee started changin' keys, and the arranger was goin' crazy, havin' to rewrite stuff for the string section..." According to Rick Bragg's authorized biography Jerry Lee Lewis: His Own Story, the conductor of the string section was astonished when Lewis informed him what he had thought was just a rehearsal would be the one and only take. Adds Bragg: "For many loyal fans, the record captured everything they loved most about him. When he sang the old rock and roll, it reminded them of a time when there would be no such music without that little bit of hillbilly in it; and so it reminded them of being young."  Years later Lewis added a lascivious swagger to the song, which had merely been a novelty in the Bopper's hands. It would spend three weeks at the top of the country charts, also becoming a Top 50 pop hit in the United States and a Top 40 hit in the United Kingdom.

The Killer Rocks On also includes Jerry Lee's amped-up version of Kris Kristofferson's "Me And Bobby McGee."  In the liner notes to the 1995 Mercury compilation Killer Country, Colin Escott marvels that Lewis "destroyed the essence of the song, but - at the same time - created a new one."  It made the Top 40 on the pop charts, the first time a record by Lewis had done so since "What'd I Say" in 1961. Despite producer Jerry Kennedy sweetening the sound with increasing "countrypolitan" accoutrements, Lewis storms through Elvis Presley's "Don't Be Cruel," Charlie Rich's "Lonely Weekends," and Fats Domino's "I'm Walkin'."  Two Joe South songs helped give the album a contemporary edge, including the well known "Games People Play."

Track listing

Charts

Personnel
Jerry Lee Lewis - vocals, piano
Chip Young, Dale Sellers, Harold Bradley, Pete Wade, Ray Edenton, Jerry Kennedy - guitar
Pete Drake - steel guitar
Kenny Lovelace - fiddle
Bob Moore - bass
Bill Strom - organ
Buddy Harman - drums
Charlie McCoy - marimba; arranger on "Turn on Your Love Light"
Dolores Edgen, Hursel Wiginton, Joe Babcock, Millie Kirkham, Rickie Page, Trish Williams - backing vocals
Cam Mullins - arrangements

References

1972 albums
Jerry Lee Lewis albums
Albums produced by Jerry Kennedy
Mercury Records albums